Dale Linderman (March 20, 1924 – October 16, 2018) was an American politician who was a member of the North Dakota House of Representatives. He represented the 14th district from 1963 to 1966 and 1969 to 1974 as a member of the Democratic party. He is a farmer.

References

1924 births
2018 deaths
Democratic Party members of the North Dakota House of Representatives